Lareh Sabzi (also Romanized as Lareh Sabzī; also known as Lareh Sabzī-ye Gel Sorkheh and Darreh Sabzī) is a village in Dowreh Rural District, Chegeni District, Dowreh County, Lorestan Province, Iran. At the 2006 census, its population was 74, in 18 families.

References 

Towns and villages in Dowreh County